Dasiphora is a genus of shrubs in the rose family Rosaceae, native to Asia, with one species D. fruticosa (shrubby cinquefoil), ranging across the entire cool temperate Northern Hemisphere. In the past, the genus was normally included in Potentilla as Potentilla sect. Rhopalostylae, but genetic evidence has shown it to be distinct.

The leaves are divided into five (occasionally three or seven) leaflets arranged pinnately, whence the name cinquefoil (French, cinque feuilles, "five leaves").

Species
, Plants of the World Online accepts the following species:
Dasiphora arbuscula (D.Don) Soják
Dasiphora dryadanthoides Juz.
Dasiphora fruticosa (L.) Rydb. (syn. Potentilla fruticosa)
Dasiphora galantha (Soják) Soják
Dasiphora glabra (G.Lodd.) Soják (syn. Potentilla glabra)
Dasiphora glabrata (Willd. ex Schltdl.) Soják (syns. Dasiphora davurica, Potentilla davurica, Potentilla fruticosa subsp. glabrata, Potentilla glabrata)
Dasiphora mandshurica (Maxim.) Juz.
Dasiphora parvifolia (Fisch. ex Lehm.) Juz. (syn. Potentilla parvifolia)
Dasiphora phyllocalyx Juz.
Dasiphora spectabilis (Businský & Soják) Businský & Soják

The Flora of China also includes Potentilla bifurca (syn. Sibbaldianthe bifurca) and P. imbricata (syn. Sibbaldianthe imbricata) in this group, but these species (which are not shrubs) do not have published combinations in Dasiphora.

References

Potentilleae
Rosaceae genera
Taxa named by Constantine Samuel Rafinesque